was a heavy machine gun used by the Imperial Japanese Army during the later stages of the Second World War. Though seemingly intended to replace the older Type 92 heavy machine gun, the weapon never underwent the same level of mass production as its predecessor due to material shortages.

Description
The Type 1 is essentially a smaller, lighter version of the Type 92 heavy machine gun. It employs the same principles of operation, simply with scaled down components. The barrel is designed to be rapidly changed in the field to prevent overheating, as a result the barrel cooling rings were reduced in size and the barrel jacket was done away with entirely. It was fed from 30-round brass feed strips.

See also
Type 3 heavy machine gun
Type 92 heavy machine gun
Hotchkiss M1914 machine gun

References

 

Heavy machine guns
World War II infantry weapons of Japan
World War II machine guns
Machine guns of Japan
Weapons and ammunition introduced in 1942